Troubled Island is an American opera in three acts composed by William Grant Still, with a libretto begun by poet Langston Hughes and completed by Verna Arvey. She married the composer following their collaboration.

Set in Haiti in 1791, Troubled Island portrays Jean Jacques Dessalines (1758–1806) and the corruption of his leadership in the Haitian revolution.  He declared himself as emperor of an independent Haiti but was assassinated by opponents. The opera premiered at the New York City Opera on March 31, 1949, notably making it the first grand opera composed by an African American to be produced by a major company.

Composition and production history
Still and Hughes began writing Troubled Island in 1936, but Hughes left the project the following year to cover the Spanish Civil War for the Baltimore Afro-American.  Arvey, a pianist and writer who never wrote a libretto before, completed the project in Hughes’ absence.

Troubled Island was completed in 1939, but Still faced problems in arranging for a production. Planned premieres in 1945 and 1948 at the New York City Opera were withdrawn, but the company presented the world premiere of  Troubled Island on March 31, 1949. It was the first time that the work of an African-American composer was presented by a major American opera company.

Although the leading roles of Dessalines and his wife Azelia were based on black Haitians, the opera company cast white opera stars Robert Weede and Marie Powers, who wore dark make-up for the 1949 premiere. African-American bass-baritone Lawrence Winters took over the role of Dessalines from Weede for the second performance of the opera and continued in the role for the remainder of the production's run.

The premiere performance was greeted with 22 curtain calls. Critical reaction to the work ranged from mixed-to-negative. Time Magazine said, “Composer Still's music, sometimes lusciously scored, sometimes naively melodic, often had more prettiness than power. In all, Troubled Island had more of the souffle of operetta than the soup bone of opera.” John Briggs of the New York Post opined, “one was never sure one was hearing a first-rate performance of an inferior work or a second-rate performance of a good one,” while Miles Kastendieck, writing for both the New York Journal-American and the Christian Science Monitor, said of Still’s music: “the result is a mixture of styles signifying talent and a feel for opera but achieving little more than a suggestion of it.”

Years later, Judith Still, the daughter of Still and Arvey, said that the New York critics intentionally panned Troubled Island due to racism. “Howard Taubman (a critic and friend of Still) came to my father and said ‘Billy, because I’m your friend I think that I should tell you this – the critics have had a meeting to decide what to do about your opera. They think the colored boy has gone far enough and they have voted to pan your opera.’ And that was it. In those days, critics had that kind of influence.” 

Following its premiere, New York City Opera staged two additional presentations, on April 1 and May 1 of 1949. To date, New York City Opera has never revived the work in full; however, a 60th-anniversary concert production of excerpts was presented by the company in March 2009 at the Schomburg Center for Research in Black Culture.  The opera has not been seen widely outside these two productions until October 19, 2013 when the South Shore Opera Company of Chicago presented the opera in full with a black cast, black chorus and black conductor. The opera was held at the Paul Robeson Theatre of the South Shore Cultural Center.

Roles

Further reading

Soll, Beverly. (2005) "I Dream A World: The Operas of William Grant Still." Fayetteville: University of Arkansas Press. 
Still, Judith Anne and Lisa M. Headlee, Eds. (2006) " Just Tell The Story - Troubled Island." Flagstaff: The Master-Player Library.

References

External links
William Grant Still Music, site with comprehensive information about him and his music
Interview, Transcript, African American Music Collection, University of Michigan
  (1937)

English-language operas
Operas by William Grant Still
1939 operas
1949 operas
Opera world premieres at New York City Opera
Operas set in the Caribbean
Operas